The Directorate for Cooperation with the Diaspora and Serbs in the Region is a coordination body of the Ministry of Foreign Affairs within Government of Serbia. It was constituted on 2 August 2012. Except for the central office in Belgrade, there is also a local one in Niš.

Organization
The director is in charge of the Office, and is appointed by the Government of Serbia. The mandate of the director is 5 years.

The first director of the Directorate was Slavka Drašković.

Jurisdiction
The jurisdiction of the Directorate is established by its statute:
 Monitoring of the status of Serbian citizens that live outside of Serbia;
 Improvement of electoral rights of Serbian citizens in diaspora and assistance in preserving spiritual, cultural and national heritage of the Serbian people that live outside of Serbia;
 Improvement of ties between of Serbian citizens and their organizations in diaspora and the Republic of Serbia;
 Informing Serbian citizens and their organizations in diaspora about political actions of the Republic of Serbia;
 Assistance involving refugees, people of Serbian origins and citizens of Serbia that live in diaspora in political, economic and cultural life of Republic of Serbia and their return to Serbia.

Goals 
 Realization of conservation strategy and strengthening the ties between diaspora and Serbia;
 Assistance in activities of diaspora parliament;
 Involving diaspora in process of investing in small and medium enterprises;
 Intercession in the process of removing administrative barriers for involving diaspora in the Serbian economy;
 Incitement of citizens of Serbia to get involved in the politics of the residing countries;
 Preservation of Serbian language via opening of schools and other institutions in diaspora;
 Making of convergent portal towards diaspora;
 Improvement of cultural, economic and other forms of cooperation with the diaspora using human capital available in diaspora;
 Presentation of the diaspora in Serbia and raising awareness of the importance of diaspora;
 Enhancement and preservation reputation of Serbia in world, struggle against Anti-Serb sentiment.

References

External links 
 Official web page of the Office for cooperation with diaspora and Serbs in the region
 Local office for cooperation with diaspora and Serbs in region in Niš
 Official Facebook page of the Office for cooperation with diaspora and Serbs in the region
 Official Twitter account of Office for cooperation with diaspora and Serbs in the region

Government agencies of Serbia
Serbian diaspora
Serb diaspora
Diaspora organizations